Geox is an Italian brand of shoe and clothing manufactured with waterproof/breathable fabrics.

Corporate history

The company was founded in 1995 by Mario Polegato. The brand name, Geox, was created from a mixture between the Greek word “geo” (earth), and “x”, a letter-element symbolizing technology.

Polegato was born in 1952 near Treviso. Originally groomed to take over the family wine-making business, company promotional material has it that the idea for the shoe came when he participated in a wine industry conference in Reno; while out jogging in Reno's hot desert climate, his feet got hot from the exertion and he had the idea to cut a couple of holes in the soles of his shoes with a Swiss Army knife.

He developed the idea into a viable product with the help of a small leather-goods business his family owned.

After unsuccessfully pitching his invention to several established footwear manufacturers, but after having passed the market testing phase for a line of children’s footwear, Polegato began large-scale production of shoes under the Geox brand name. That same year, he improved the original patent and extended the product range to men’s and women’s footwear.

On September 8, 2020, Geox filed for bankruptcy in Canada.

Production sites are in China, Indonesia and Vietnam. In July 2021, Geox announced the closure of its Vranje plant in Serbia. The plant was opened in 2015. This closure will lead to the loss of 1,200 jobs.

Research and development
The Geox group has consistently invested in innovation, ever since it was founded. Its Montebelluna head offices are host to R&D facilities, which are unique in their kind. Here, 15 engineers, chemists and physicists are employed in research on perspiration and human-generated heat-movement patterns, testing all materials used in their footwear and manufacturing clothing.

The Montebelluna-based team of scientists have created and patented new machinery to help them pursue their research. Geox also works with major research labs and universities to test and refine new technology.

References

External links

Corporate site

 Geox Retailers

 The Shoe Box of Knowle

 
Clothing manufacturers
Sportswear brands
Shoe brands
Clothing companies established in 1995
Retail companies established in 1995
Clothing brands of Italy
Sporting goods manufacturers of Italy
Shoe companies of Italy
Italian companies established in 1995
Companies based in Veneto
Companies that have filed for bankruptcy in Canada